The olivospinal fasciculus (Helweg) was thought to arise in the vicinity of the inferior olivary nucleus in the medulla oblongata, and was thought to be seen only in the cervical region of the medulla spinalis, where it forms a small triangular area at the periphery, close to the most lateral of the anterior nerve roots. Its existence is now strongly doubted.

References

External links
 

Motor system
Brainstem